Aestuariibaculum is a genus from the family of Flavobacteriaceae.

References

Further reading 
 

Flavobacteria
Bacteria genera